ASM Raqibul Hasan (born 15 January 1953 in Dhaka) is a former Bangladeshi cricketer who played in two ODIs in 1986. He is widely regarded as one of the best Bangladeshi batsman of his era. After retiring from international cricket, he has become a match referee. He won the Independence Award in 2023 for his contribution to the field of sports.

Early years
An opening batsman, Raqibul Hasan made his first-class debut in 1968–69 at the age of 16, and was soon selected to represent Pakistan's U19 team against the English Schoolboys. He was twelfth man in a Test match against New Zealand at Dhaka in 1969–70. Barely sixteen at the time, he seemed sure to have a lengthy Test career ahead of him.

However, on 26 February 1971 a match started at Dhaka in the Bangabandhu Stadium. It was a four-day match against the Commonwealth side. The Pakistan team was playing and he was picked to play for them. At 18 years old he became the first and only Bengali to play for a full-strength Pakistan team. The match couldn't be finished as on the last day demonstrations erupted all over the city and the stadium was invaded. Within a month of his debut, events in his homeland of East Pakistan took a shocking turn, and he was forced to flee for his life.

It would be nine long months before Bangladesh won its independence, at the cost of millions of lives. In Raqibul's family there were six casualties. On top of that, he lost his best friend, Haleem Chaudhri, who was his opening partner for East Pakistan and his roommate on tour. And he lost his cricketing godfather, Mushtaq, the man who spotted him as a boy and gave him his first chance at club level.

In independent Bangladesh
After returning to Bangladesh, Raqibul became a key figure in building Bangladesh cricket. He led the side in their return to the international arena. In December 1976, when the visiting MCC started their tour with a two-day match at Rajshahi against North Zone, he was named captain and top scored with 73 in the second innings. He bettered that, scoring 74 for South Zone at Jessore. But his proudest moment of the season came at Dhaka as he was part of the Bangladesh team (led by Shamim Kabir) that played in the three-day unofficial Test match against MCC in January 1977. This historic match marked the resumption of international cricket in Dhaka.

In full ODIs
Raqibul played in two ODI's for Bangladesh. He scored 5 against Pakistan, and 12 against Sri Lanka in the second Asia Cup in 1986.

In ICC Trophy
Raqibul Hasan played in three ICC Trophy tournaments. In 1979, he scored 52 runs in 4 matches with a highest of 34 against Canada. He did better in 1982, scoring 167 runs at an average of 27.83. His highest, 42, came against West Africa. Finally, in 1986, he scored 121 runs at an average of 24.19. His unbeaten 47 helped Bangladesh beat Argentina. He retired from international cricket after the 1986 ICC Trophy.

Raqibul as captain
He had two spells as captain of Bangladesh; first during 1977–79 and second during the 1983–84 season. He had a difficult time during the Sri Lanka series in January 1978. The Sri Lankan team was far superior, winning all the three-day unofficial Test matches. Raqibul Hasan failed to convert quite a few starts into any score of substance. He (and his team) did better, against the Indians (Deccan Blues) (led by former Indian captain Ajit Wadekar) in February 1978. His defiant 64 helped the local side reach 320/9, despite the efforts of Indian leg spinner M. V. Narasimha Rao, who took 6 for 120. This was the first time Bangladesh crossed the 300 mark in an international match. However, Raqibul failed with the bat the following season, against a relatively weak MCC squad. It was apparent that the captaincy was becoming a burden for him. So, the selectors chose wicketkeeper-batsman Shafiq-ul-Haq Hira as captain for the 1st ICC Trophy in England in 1979.

Raqibul's second spell as captain came during the busy 1983–84 season. He led Bangladesh to victory in the 1984 South-East Asia Cup in Dhaka in January. In 1985, Gazi Ashraf Hossain Lipu was named as the new captain.

Domestic cricket
Raqibul played his League cricket in Dhaka for Victoria Sporting Club and Mohammedan Sporting Club.

References

External links

 "Meet the only Bengali to have played for Pakistan" at Cricinfo
 "Former captains praise brave new generation" at Cricinfo

Bangladeshi cricketers
East Pakistan cricketers
1953 births
Living people
Cricketers from Dhaka
Bangladesh One Day International cricketers
Dacca University cricketers
East Pakistan Whites cricketers
Wicket-keepers
St. Gregory's High School and College alumni

bn:রকিবুল হাসান
Recipients of the Independence Day Award